Locus Map is a multi-functional Android navigation app adding advanced online and offline GPS capabilities to Android devices. Primarily it is designed and used for leisure time outdoor activities like hiking, biking, geocaching. Besides its leisure time utilization the app is also used by professionals e.g. for collecting geospatial data, by rescue squad teams, aerial reconnaissance teams etc.

The app was developed in 2009 by Czech developer Jiří Mlavec, founder of Asamm Software company, based in Prague, Czech Republic. Locus Map development is carried out in cooperation with the community of its users-contributors and as such is partially crowd-sourced.

The application has registered up to 2 500 000 installations and has been reviewed in professional media (e.g. Computer Bild. or AndroidPIT). It received awards in several app competitions and polls.

Maps 
Locus Map displays maps of various providers in online and offline mode:

Online maps 
 US - USGS, OpenStreetMap, ChartBundle...
 Europe - IGN (France), Outdooractive  (Germany, Austria), Ordnance Survey Opendata (UK), Kapsi.fi (Finland), Turistautak (Hungary), SHOCart (Czech Republic and Slovakia), Osmapa.pl, (Poland), Skoterleder (Sweden), Map1.eu (Europe)...
 other parts of the World  - Visicom (Ukraine, Asia, World), GSI maps (Japan), SledMap  (World), Navigasi  (Indonesia),  NzTopoMaps  (New Zealand) and others
 support of WMS sources - meteorological maps, NASA maps, cadastral maps...
Most of the online maps can be downloaded for offline use.

Offline maps 
 the World - dedicated vector maps with changeable themes - hiking, cycling, skiing, road or city use - OSM based and redesigned
 Switzerland - SwissTopo maps
 Germany, Austria - Outdooractive  maps
 support of SQLiteDB, TAR, MBT, GEMF, Orux or RMAP formats
 support of other OpenStreetMap data or custom map themes

Features 
Search of addresses (online and offline), coordinates or phone contacts, Google Places and Wikipedia for local places

Points of interest (POI) & Tracks - creating personal points, search and sorting of OSM based points of interest in an offline database, planning routes, sound notifications of approaching points or leaving routes

Geocaching - Locus Map is one of the official Geocaching.com API partners. It enables downloading geocaches for offline use by the Geocaching4Locus add-on, navigation to geocaches with map and compass, online and offline logging, supports waypoints, PocketQuery, trackables and spoilers

Track recording - creating statistics and charts, customizable recording profiles, TTS generated audio-coached workouts, support of external bluetooth and ANT+ sensorsTurn-by-turn navigation and guidance - navigation with voice commands, line guidance to a point or along a route on map or by compass

Live tracking - real time sharing user's position with other users publicly or in private groups

Cycling computer functions - speedometer, odometer, average speed, maximum speed, elevation profile, elevation gain, customizable dashboard, digits are displayed above a map, support of external sensors for monitoring heart rate and pedaling cadence

Import/export - importing/exporting points and routes from/to the Internet or from/to other software in a wide range of formats (KML, KMZ, GPX...), exporting workouts to webservers like Strava, Runkeeper, GPSies, Google Earth, Vylety-zabava.cz etc.

GPS - skyplot displaying actual satellite network, GPS status notifications, support of external GPS units

Licence 
Locus Map is released in Free and Pro versions. Free version has limited features and contains an advertisement banner strip. Locus Map Free is available for free in Google Play Store, on Amazon or in Samsung App Store. Locus Map Pro version can be purchased in Google Play Store only.

Locus community 
Locus Map has been developed in cooperation with its users who communicate with the app's developers via dedicated forum or general GPS or navigation discussions. The main source of users' contributions is the helpdesk with voting system - users themselves vote for changes and improvements in the app. Despite the app developers operate in the Czech republic, major part of the Locus community is located in Germany. Also the application translations are crowd-sourced

See also 
OpenStreetMap

References

External links
Home Page
OpenStreetMap wiki page
OpenAndroMaps
Visicom Home Page

Further reading 
 Locus Map Reference Guide: Collecting Geospatial Data, University of Connecticut
 MAPC2MAPC Help pages: Making maps for Locus
 Com-Magazine reference guide

Satellite navigation software
Android (operating system) software
Mobile route-planning software